The Sorani Kurdish Wikipedia or Central Kurdish Wikipedia is the Sorani Kurdish version of Wikipedia.
It was founded in 2009.

See also 
 Kurdish Wikipedia
 Kurmanji Kurdish Wikipedia

References

External links 

Kurdish (Sorani)

Kurdish-language encyclopedias
Kurdish-language websites
Wikipedias by language
Internet properties established in 2009